Marriott Reef is a small group of granite islets, with a combined area of 3.4 ha, in south-eastern Australia.  It forms part of Tasmania’s Pasco Island Group, lying in eastern Bass Strait off the north-west coast of Flinders Island in the Furneaux Group.

Fauna
Seabirds and waders recorded as breeding on the island include little penguin, short-tailed shearwater, Pacific gull and sooty oystercatcher.

See also

 List of islands of Tasmania

References

Furneaux Group